Infernal Devices is a steampunk novel by K. W. Jeter, published in 1987. The novel was republished in 2011 by Angry Robot Books with a new introduction by the author, cover art by John Coulthart, and an afterword by Jeff VanderMeer.

Plot
The novel takes place primarily in Victorian London.

The story begins as a mysterious Brown Leather Man enters George Dower's watch shop with a strange device in need of repair, claiming it was made by George's father, a brilliant watchmaker skilled in all forms of clockwork devices. George, who has inherited his father's shop, but not his father's talent, agrees to look at the device, although he knows his chances of repairing it are slim at best. George is quickly dragged into an ongoing conflict involving the Royal Anti-Society, the Godly Army and the Ladies Union for the Suppression of Carnal Vice. His investigation leads him to a strange neighborhood in London, Wetwick, which is inhabited by denizens who are a hybrid of humans and fish.

Another of George's customers are an impatient man who wears blue-glass spectacles and his female companion, who both use a slang which is strange to George as a Victorian Englishman but which modern readers will recognize as twentieth-century American vernacular. (The strangers are not time travelers but a Victorian English citizens who possessed a device which enabled them to view what is, for them, the future; they have learned late twentieth-century slang through lip-reading.)

As the story develops, George realizes that his father was more skilled than even he knew; his father had begun experimenting with building clockwork humans, finishing with an automaton who is an exact double of George himself, but which possesses superior sexual abilities and a skill with the violin comparable to Paganini. Inevitably, a woman abducts George in the mistaken belief that she has captured his clockwork twin.

Reception
J. Michael Caparula reviewed Infernal Devices in Space Gamer/Fantasy Gamer No. 84. Caparula commented that "I loved this book, given my penchant for Victoriana, and also because of Jeter's colorful characterizations, superb plotting, and luminescent writing style, which recalls that of Blaylock. What's more, humor abounds, especially in the character of Scape, and in the  ending, which is too good to be true."

Reviews
Review by Faren Miller (1987) in Locus, #314 March 1987
Review by Robert Reilly (1987) in Fantasy Review, June 1987
Review [French] by Pascal J. Thomas (1987) in A&A, #108-109
Review by Don D'Ammassa (1987) in Science Fiction Chronicle, #95 August 1987
Review by Don D'Ammassa (1987) in Science Fiction Chronicle, #96 September 1987
Review by Terry Broome (1988) in Paperback Inferno, #75
Review [French] by Richard Comballot (1989) in Fiction, #407
Review [French] by Jonathan Dornet (1989) in A&A, #120-120bis
Review [French] by Thierry Bosch (1989) in Yellow Submarine, #62
Review by Charles de Lint (1989) in Elliott's Bookline
Review by Brendan Byrne (2011) in Strange Horizons, 20 June 2011
Review by uncredited (2011) in Weird Tales #358

References

1987 American novels
American science fiction novels
American steampunk novels
Novels by K. W. Jeter
Novels set in London